Matt Woods (born 9 September 1976) is an English footballer, who played as a defender in the Football League for Chester City.

References

1976 births
Living people
Everton F.C. players
Chester City F.C. players
Stalybridge Celtic F.C. players
English Football League players
Association football central defenders
People from Gosport
English footballers